Dan-Coman Șova (born 9 April 1973 in Bucharest) is a Romanian lawyer and politician. A member of the Social Democratic Party (PSD), he has sat in the Romanian Senate since 2008, representing Olt County.

Dan Șova was appointed  Minister for Infrastructure Projects of National Interest and Foreign Investment on 21 December 2012. Previously, he served as Minister Delegate for Liaison with Parliament

He graduated from the Faculty of Law (1995) and the Faculty of History (2001) of the University of Bucharest.

See also

References

External links

 Profile at the Romanian Senate site
  Official website

Members of the Senate of Romania
Social Democratic Party (Romania) politicians
Romanian jurists
Romanian public relations people
Politicians from Bucharest
University of Bucharest alumni
1973 births
Living people
Romanian politicians convicted of corruption